Mary of Hungary (c. 1257 – 25 March 1323), of the Árpád dynasty, was Queen of Naples by marriage to King Charles II. She was a daughter of Stephen V of Hungary and his wife Elizabeth the Cuman. Mary served as regent in Provence in 1290–1294 and in Naples in 1295–96, 1296–98, and 1302, during the absences of her husband.

Early life

Mary's mother followed the Shamanist religion, like other Cumans. She was considered a Pagan by contemporary Christians of Europe and Elizabeth had to convert to Catholicism in order to marry Maria's father, Stephen. It's unknown at what age she converted to Christianity, but could be possible that she was already raised as an Orthodox in the Hungarian royal court since her childhood.

Mary was the second of six children. Her sisters, Elizabeth and Catherine both became Queen of Serbia.  Another sister, Anna married Andronikos II Palaiologos. Mary's only brother was Ladislaus IV of Hungary.

Her paternal grandparents were Béla IV of Hungary and his wife Maria Laskarina. Her maternal grandparents could have been Köten, leader of a tribe of Cumans and an unknown mother.

Marriage
Mary was 12 years old when she wed Charles II of Naples in Naples on 6 August 1270. The marriage was intended to be a double alliance between Naples and Hungary to support the intended conquest of Byzantium by Naples, but it did not serve its purpose as her brother in 1272 made an alliance with Byzantium as well. Maria accompanied Charles on his trips and spent 1278-82 in Provence with her consort. In 1284, she made her first political act: when Charles was taken captive by Aragon, she made the decision to free the Aragonese prisoner Beatrice of Hohenstaufen.

Queen
In 1285, Charles became monarch but remained in an Aragonese prison. She did not take part in the regency for him in Naples, but remained in Provence, where she did take part in the administration from time to time, though she was not formal regent. In 1288, she took part in the negotiations of her consort's release, and the same year, she made a peace treaty with Aragon. Charles was released the same year, and they returned to Naples together. 

In 1290-94, she was regent for him in Provence.

Struggle for the Hungarian throne

On 10 July 1290, Mary's brother, King Ladislaus IV of Hungary was murdered by three Cuman assassins,. Since Ladislaus had died childless, the question now was who would succeed him: in addition to Mary, her sisters Catherine and Elisabeth believed that they had claims, as did the children of the youngest sister, Anna. In addition, the crown was already claimed by Ladislaus´ cousin Andrew the Venetian, who was the next heir according to agnatic descent. Andrew was summoned from Vienna by Archbishop Lodomer, who crowned him King Andrew III on 23 July with the Holy Crown of Hungary in Székesfehérvár, the traditional site for Hungarian coronations.

However, Mary refused to accept Andrew´s right to the crown, because in her view his father Stephen the Posthumous had been a bastard, and thus not a legitimate member of the House of Árpád (the royal family of Hungary). Stephen had been born to the third wife of King Andrew II after her husband´s death, and was not recognised by his elder half-brothers, including Mary´s grandfather Béla IV. In April 1291, Mary declared her own claim to the throne. The Babonići, Frankopans, Šubići, and other leading Croatian and Slavonian noble families seemingly accepted her as the lawful monarch, although as events showed their loyalty in fact vacillated between her and Andrew III. In January 1292, she transferred her claim to Hungary to her son, the 18-year-old Charles Martel Charles was then set up by Pope Nicholas IV and the church party as the titular King of Hungary (1290–1295) as the successor of Mary´s brother.

Andrew III was unable to give full attention to the conflict with Mary and Charles, because he was engaged in a conflict with another challenger, Albert of Austria. In the ensuing war, Andrew recovered from Albert several important towns and fortresses - including Pozsony (Bratislava) and Sopron - which had previously been held by the powerful Kőszegi family. After the Peace of Hainburg, which concluded the war, was signed on 26 August, the Kőszegis threw their support to Mary´s party. They rose up in open rebellion against Andrew in spring 1292, acknowledging Charles Martel as King of Hungary. Andrew´s troops subdued the rebellion by July, but in August the Kőszegis captured and imprisoned him;  he was freed only four months later.
 
During 1290, Mary's sister Elisabeth fled from Bohemia with her son because her husband had lost favour and was executed, Mary allowed Elisabeth and her son to stay in Naples with her, before she became a nun, but escaped and remarried to Stephen Uroš II Milutin of Serbia (brother of Catherine's husband).

Catherine´s husband Stefan Dragutin, ruler of Syrmia, was allegedly willing to support Mary and her son Charles Martel. Charles Martel granted Slavonia to Dragutin's son, Vladislav, in 1292, but most Hungarian noblemen and prelates remained loyal to Andrew III. Dragutin also sought a reconciliation with Andrew, and Vladislav married Constance, the granddaughter of Andrew's uncle, Albertino Morosini in 1293. 
 
Charles Martel died of the plague in Naples on 12 August 1295. After his death, the Pope confirmed Mary´s sole rights in Hungary on 30 August 1295. She was the representative of her son at the negotiations with the Pope in 1295-96. Between 1296 and 1298, she served as regent of Naples in the absence of her consort. She served as regent the last time in 1302. After this, she lost her influence over state affairs, and retired to pious duties such as to finance convents and churches.

A group of powerful lords—including the Šubići, Kőszegis and Csáks—urged Mary´s husband Charles II of Naples to send Charles Robert, the 12-year-old son of Charles Martel, to Hungary in order to become king. The young Charles Robert disembarked in Split in August 1300. Although many lords in Croatia and Slavonian and most Dalmatian towns recognized him as king before he marched to Zagreb, Charles Robert was unsuccessful, because powerful Hungarian nobles, including the Kőszegis and Matthew Csák, reconciled with Andrew. Andrew's envoy to the Holy See noted that Pope Boniface VIII did not support Charles Robert's adventure, either. Andrew, who had been in poor health for a while, was planning to capture Charles Robert, but he died in Buda Castle on 14 January 1301.

After Andrew´s sudden death, Charles Robert hurried to Esztergom where the Archbishop-elect, Gregory Bicskei, crowned him with a provisional crown before 13 May. However, most Hungarians considered Charles's coronation unlawful because customary law required that it should have been performed with the Holy Crown of Hungary in Székesfehérvár. During the following few years, different claimants fought for the Hungarian throne until Charles was finally proclaimed king on 27 November 1308 at the Diet in Pest. , and finally crowned on 27 August 1310 in Székesfehérvár. Ultimately the claims of the sisters Mary and Catherine were united in a common descendant when the pair's great-great-granddaughter, Mary of Hungary, ascended to the Hungarian throne in 1382. When the line of Charles Martel and the Angevins in Hungary died out, it was Sigismund, a remote descendant of Bela IV, whose family succeeded.

Later life

Mary's husband Charles of Naples died in May 1309. There is no evidence that Mary became a nun, as has sometimes been rumored, but she did spend a lot of her time in convents. She lived in Naples for the rest of her life, where she died on 25 March 1323. She was buried in Naples at the Santa Maria Donna Regina.

Children

Mary and her husband had fourteen children:
 Charles Martel (1271 – 1295), titular King of Hungary.
 Margaret (1273 – December 31, 1299), Countess of Anjou and Maine, married at Corbeil August 16, 1290 Charles of Valois, brother of king of France, and became ancestress of the Valois dynasty.
 Louis (February 9, 1274, Nocera – August 19, 1298, Chateau de Brignoles), Bishop of Toulouse, later canonized.
 Robert I (1276 – 1343) King of Naples.
 Philip I (1278 – 1331) Prince of Achaea and Taranto, Despot of Romania, Lord of Durazzo, titular Emperor of Constantinople
 Blanche (1280 – October 14, 1310, Barcelona), married at Villebertran November 1, 1295 James II of Aragon
 Raymond Berengar (1281 – 1307), Count of Provence, Prince of Piedmont and Andria.
 John (1283 – aft. March 16, 1308), a priest.
 Tristan (1284 – bef. 1288)
 Eleanor, (August 1289 – August 9, 1341, Monastery of St. Nicholas, Arene, Elis), married at Messina May 17, 1302 Frederick III of Sicily
 Maria (1290 – c. 1346), married firstly at Palma de Majorca September 20, 1304 Sancho I of Majorca, married secondly 1326 Jaime de Ejerica (1298 – April 1335).
 Peter (1291 – August 29, 1315, Battle of Montecatini), Count of Gravina
 John (1294 – April 5, 1336, Naples), Duke of Durazzo, Prince of Achaea, and Count of Gravina, married March 1318 (divorced 1321) Matilda of Hainaut (November 29, 1293 – 1336), and married secondly November 14, 1321 Agnes of Périgord (d. 1345)
 Beatrice (1295 – c. 1321), married firstly April 1305 Azzo VIII d'Este, Marquis of Ferrara (d. 1308), married secondly 1309 Bertrand III of Baux, Count of Andria (d. 1351).

Ancestry

In fiction
Marie of Hungary is a character in Les Rois maudits (The Accursed Kings), a series of French historical novels by Maurice Druon. She was portrayed by Denise Grey in the 1972 French miniseries adaptation of the series, and by Line Renaud in the 2005 adaptation.

See also
 Cuman people
 Cumania

References

 Dizionario Biografico degli Italiani - Volume 70 (2007)

Sources

 
 

 
 
 

 
 
 

House of Árpád
Hungarian princesses
Royal consorts of Naples
Countesses of Anjou
Countesses of Maine
Countesses of Provence
Princesses of Achaea
Capetian House of Anjou
Albanian royal consorts
Hungarian expatriates in Italy
1257 births
1323 deaths
Hungarian people of Greek descent
Hungarian people of German descent
Princesses of Taranto
13th-century women rulers
14th-century Hungarian people
13th-century Hungarian people
Pretenders to the Hungarian throne
People of Cuman descent
14th-century Italian women
13th-century Italian women
12th-century Hungarian women
13th-century Hungarian women
Daughters of kings
Queen mothers
14th-century women rulers